The Truants is a 1904 novel by the British writer A.E.W. Mason. An English officer deserts from the French Foreign Legion to return home to confront a man who has been bothering his wife.

Film adaptation
In 1922 the novel was turned into a British silent film of the same title directed by Sinclair Hill.

References

Bibliography
 Low, Rachael. History of the British Film, 1918-1929. George Allen & Unwin, 1971.

1904 British novels
Novels set in England
Novels by A. E. W. Mason
British novels adapted into films